Aleksandr Krasnoyartsev (born 3 August 1971) is a Soviet field hockey player. He competed in the men's tournament at the 1992 Summer Olympics.

References

External links
 

1971 births
Living people
Soviet male field hockey players
Olympic field hockey players of the Unified Team
Field hockey players at the 1992 Summer Olympics
Place of birth missing (living people)